Do It ('Til You're Satisfied) is the debut studio album by American band B. T. Express from Brooklyn, New York. It was released in 1974 via Scepter Records. Production was handled by Jeff Lane and Trade Martin. The album peaked at number five on the Billboard 200 and topped the Top R&B Albums chart. It was certified Gold by the Recording Industry Association of America on March 6, 1975 for selling over 500,000 copies in the United States.

It spawned four singles: "That's What I Want For You Baby" b/w "Do You Like It", "Do It ('Til You're Satisfied)", "Express" and "Once You Get It".

Track listing

Certifications

References

External links

See also
List of Billboard number-one R&B albums of 1975

1974 debut albums
B. T. Express albums
Scepter Records albums